is a 2005 vertically scrolling shooter developed by Japanese developer Cave and published by Taito. It was ported to the PlayStation 2 in 2006.

Gameplay 

Ibara is very similar to 8ing/Raizing's Battle Garegga and Battle Bakraid games. So much so that Ibara could be considered a pseudo-sequel or, at least, a spiritual successor. The similarities are numerous - some are subtle, some are easily spotted. These include combining archaic technology such as biplanes with more advanced machinery; firing and a power-up system; and a medal collecting system which drastically increases scoring. The game features a similar method of earning bombs and a delay when launching them as well. Some of the enemies and their attack patterns are very familiar such as the large cranes in stage 1 and the minigun-wielding first boss. The enemy's explosions spiral around when destroying some of the heavier weapons/scenery and thin, while seemingly camouflaged enemy bullets are scattered around the play area in comparable patterns. More subtle references include the HUD layout which lists the name of the current stage at the top of the screen and, when starting a stage, tells users the title of the background music that is playing.

A notable feature of Ibara is the inclusion of a variable, real-time difficulty system by way of the Rank system. The player's rank increases as they acquire more items and cause more damage, increasing the difficulty of the game along with it. The number of enemies does not increase but the number of bullets fired towards the user does, often reaching a ridiculous level of bullet density. There are ways of lowering this rank system if the odds appear too much. The only known way of decreasing the player's Rank in Ibara is to die. The more lives you have, the less the rank decreases when you die. In the later version, Ibara Kuro: Black Label, Rank can be decreased by cancelling bullets with a bomb, however Rank also increases much faster in this version, potentially increasing from minimum to maximum in a matter of seconds.

Plot
In the delicate realm of Keritona, 10 ladies are built by an ancient doctor.

Development
Programmer Shinobu Yagawa previously worked on the games Recca, and Battle Garegga.

Release 
The game was released in arcades on July 15, 2005, and it was released on the PlayStation 2 on February 23, 2006.

To remedy some of the concerns fans had with the original version of the game, Cave released an updated version in limited distribution called Ibara Kuro: Black Label. It was released on February 10, 2006. The update contains many additions, some of which appeared earlier in the released PlayStation 2 port in the form of Arrange Mode.

A sequel, Pink Sweets: Ibara Sorekara, was released in the arcades on April 21, 2006.

Reception
Weekly Famitsu magazine awarded the PlayStation 2 version of Ibara a score of 26/40 based on four reviews (7/7/6/6).

References

External links
 Official websites for Arcade and  versions 

2005 video games
Arcade video games
Cave (company) games
Cooperative video games
Japan-exclusive video games
Multiplayer and single-player video games
PlayStation 2 games
Steampunk video games
Vertically scrolling shooters
Video games developed in Japan
Video games scored by Shinji Hosoe